The canton of Athis-Val de Rouvre (before March 2020: canton of Athis-de-l'Orne) is an administrative division of the Orne department, northwestern France. Its borders were modified at the French canton reorganisation which came into effect in March 2015. Its seat is in Athis-Val de Rouvre.

It consists of the following communes:
 
Athis-Val de Rouvre
Bazoches-au-Houlme
Berjou
Briouze
Cahan
Champcerie
Craménil
Durcet
Faverolles
Giel-Courteilles
Le Grais
Habloville
La Lande-Saint-Siméon
Lignou 
Le Ménil-de-Briouze
Ménil-Gondouin
Ménil-Hermei
Ménil-Hubert-sur-Orne
Ménil-Vin
Montreuil-au-Houlme
Neuvy-au-Houlme
Pointel
Putanges-le-Lac
Saint-André-de-Briouze
Sainte-Honorine-la-Chardonne
Sainte-Honorine-la-Guillaume
Sainte-Opportune
Saint-Hilaire-de-Briouze
Saint-Philbert-sur-Orne
Les Yveteaux

References

Cantons of Orne